KBST (1490 AM) is a radio station  broadcasting a News Talk Information format. Licensed to Big Spring, Texas, United States, the station serves the Big Spring-Snyder area.  The station is currently owned by Kbest Media, LLC, and includes programming from Fox Sports Radio and Premiere Radio Networks.

KBST signed on in 1936. It was an early affiliate of the Texas State Network (1938). The station was co-owned with the Big Spring Herald for many years, and was spun off in 1959 to "The Snyder Corporation" owned by Ted Snider and Winston Wrinkle.

KBST began as a 100-watt full-time operation. It raised day power to 250 watts in 1959, 1,000 watts days in 1964, and 1,000 watts at nights in 1984. It broadcast in C-Quam AM Stereo in 1985.

References

External links

BST (AM)
News and talk radio stations in the United States
Radio stations established in 1936
1936 establishments in Texas